Bernard Rubin (6 December 1896 – 27 June 1936) was an Australian born racing driver and pilot who was a member of the "Bentley Boys" team at the Bentley Motor Company and winner of the 1928 24 Hours of Le Mans.

Personal life
The son of Australian pearl salesman Mark Rubin (1867 – 1919), Bernard was born in the Melbourne suburb of Carlton, before he eventually moved to London with his family in 1908. His mother was the former Rebecca de Vahl Davis, who came from a notable Jewish Melbourne family. He had a brother, well-known grazier, art collector and philanthropist Harold de Vahl Rubin (1899–1964). His uncle, wealthy entrepreneur Abraham de Vahl Davis (1864 – 1912), went down with the steamship SS Koombana after having purchased the legendary – and presumably cursed – Roseate Pearl on behalf of Bernard's father, the Broome Pearler Mark Rubin. On 29 March 1935, in Paris, Rubin married Audrey Mary Simpson, daughter of Charles Ringham Simpson.

Rubin served in the Royal Garrison Artillery in World War I where he was badly injured and required three years of treatment before he could walk again. Following his father's death in 1919, Rubin began purchasing properties in Australia's Northern Territory, before his interest in auto racing developed in 1928.

Motorsports
Rubin became close friends with Woolf Barnato, the director of Bentley Motors, and even lived together for some time. Rubin made his driving debut at Brooklands in 1928 where he finished in sixth place before he made his first appearance at the 24 Hours of Le Mans. Rubin and Barnato won the event in a Bentley 4½ Litre, despite the car being damaged during the race.

Rubin was the first Australian to win the 24 Hours of Le Mans. As at 2017, four Australians have won Le Mans: Rubin (1928), Vern Schuppan (1983), Geoff Brabham (1993) and David Brabham (2009).

In July 1929 he came eighth in the Irish Grand Prix. In August 1929 Rubin was injured when his Bentley overturned during the RAC Tourist Trophy on the first lap.  With his injuries, Rubin turned to team ownership, and helped fund fellow "Bentley Boy" Henry Birkin's racing efforts. In 1933 they shared the wheel of an MG K3 in the famed Mille Miglia race and won their class before Birkin raced Rubin's Alfa Romeo with George Eyston and Whitney Straight. Birkin later drove Rubin's Maserati 3000 in the Tripoli Grand Prix in May 1933 during which, while reaching over for a cigarette during a pit stop, he burnt his forearm on the exhaust and died five weeks later.

In April 1934 Rubin flew to Australia in a Leopard Moth with test-pilot K.F.H. Waller to get familiar with the route and arrangements for the Centenary Air Race from Mildenhall to Melbourne in October same year. Their return flight of 8 days, 12 hours was not officially timed but was ten hours faster than Jim Mollison's World Record.  He entered his Bentley-green de Havilland Comet in the air race but was unable to compete due to severe illness. Waller and former Royal Navy pilot Owen Cathcart-Jones finished fourth in the green Comet and, returning to England, set a round-trip record of 130 flying hours. They also set a new record Darwin-London of 130 hours total and for this earned a Royal Aero Club silver medal.

Bernard Rubin died in England of pulmonary tuberculosis in 1936. His body was taken back to Australia, where he is buried in Fawkner Crematorium and Memorial Park, Melbourne.

Career results

Complete 24 Hours of Le Mans results

References

 
 

Bentley Boys
Brooklands people
24 Hours of Le Mans drivers
24 Hours of Le Mans winning drivers
British Army personnel of World War I
Royal Garrison Artillery officers
20th-century deaths from tuberculosis
Australian Jews
Racing drivers from Melbourne
1936 deaths
1896 births
Australian emigrants to England
Sportspeople from London
English Jews
English racing drivers
Australian aviators
English aviators
Grand Prix drivers
Tuberculosis deaths in England